Abdulla Abdo Omar Yasser (born 27 March 1988) is a Bahraini professional footballer who plays as a defender who currently plays for Al-Muharraq and Bahrain.

International career
On 4 October 2007, Yaser made his debut for the Bahraini national team, starting in a friendly match against Singapore. On 4 January 2009, Yaser scored his first international goal in a 3–1 win against Iraq in the Arabian Gulf Cup in Oman.

International goals
Scores and Results list Bahrain's goal tally first

|-
| 1. || 4 January 2009 || Sultan Qaboos Sports Complex, Muscat, Oman ||  ||  ||  || 19th Arabian Gulf Cup
|-
| 2. || 30 March 2015 || Bahrain National Stadium, Riffa, Bahrain ||  ||  ||  || Friendly
|-
| 3. || 1 September 2016 ||Bahrain National Stadium, Riffa, Bahrain ||  ||  ||  || Friendly
|-
| 4. || 13 June 2017 || Sport toplumy, Daşoguz, Turkmenistan ||  ||  ||  || 2019 AFC Asian Cup qualification || (AFC)
|-
| 5. || 27 March 2018 || Bahrain National Stadium, Riffa, Bahrain ||  ||  ||  || 2019 AFC Asian Cup qualification || (AFC)
|}

References

1988 births
Living people
Bahraini footballers
2015 AFC Asian Cup players
Bahrain international footballers
Association football fullbacks
Sportspeople from Manama